Artsyom Vasilyew (born 23 January 1997) is a Belarusian footballer.

References

External links
 
 
 Profile at FC Minsk website 

1997 births
Living people
Belarusian footballers
Association football forwards
FC Minsk players
FC Gorodeya players
FC Energetik-BGU Minsk players
FC Arsenal Dzerzhinsk players
FC Dnepr Rogachev players